William Cabrera José (born 16 October 1992) is a Dominican Republic badminton player. He was the bronze medalist at the XVII Pan American Games in the men's doubles event. Cabrera also competed in three consecutives Central American and Caribbean Games in 2010, 2014, and 2018.

Achievements

Pan American Games 
Men's doubles

BWF International Challenge/Series 
Men's singles

Men's doubles

Mixed doubles

  BWF International Challenge tournament
  BWF International Series tournament
  BWF Future Series tournament

References

External links 
 

1992 births
Living people
Dominican Republic male badminton players
Badminton players at the 2015 Pan American Games
Badminton players at the 2019 Pan American Games
Pan American Games bronze medalists for the Dominican Republic
Pan American Games medalists in badminton
Medalists at the 2015 Pan American Games
Competitors at the 2010 Central American and Caribbean Games
Competitors at the 2014 Central American and Caribbean Games
Competitors at the 2018 Central American and Caribbean Games
20th-century Dominican Republic people
21st-century Dominican Republic people